The women's normal hill individual ski jumping competition for the 2018 Winter Olympics in Pyeongchang, South Korea, was held on 12 February 2018 at the Alpensia Ski Jumping Stadium.

Summary
The defending champion was Carina Vogt, the field also included the 2014 silver medalist Daniela Iraschko-Stolz. None of them returned to the podium. Maren Lundby, who showed the best results in both jumps, became the champion. Katharina Althaus won the silver medal, and  Sara Takanashi became third. For all of them this was the first Olympic medal.

In the victory ceremony, the medals were presented by Octavian Morariu, member of the International Olympic Committee accompanied by Erik Røste, Norwegian Ski Federation president.

Results
The final was started at 21:50.

References

Ski jumping at the 2018 Winter Olympics
Women's events at the 2018 Winter Olympics